The 2013 CONCACAF Champions League Final was the final of the 2012–13 CONCACAF Champions League, the 5th edition of the CONCACAF Champions League under its current format, and overall the 48th edition of the premium football club competition organized by CONCACAF, the regional governing body of North America, Central America, and the Caribbean.

The final was contested in two-legged home-and-away format between two Mexican teams, Santos Laguna and Monterrey. The first leg was hosted by Santos Laguna at Estadio Corona in Torreón on April 24, 2013, while the second leg was hosted by Monterrey at Estadio Tecnológico in Monterrey on May 1, 2013. The winner earned the right to represent CONCACAF at the 2013 FIFA Club World Cup, entering at the quarterfinal stage.

The first leg ended in a 0–0 draw. Monterrey won the second leg 4–2 after overcoming a two-goal deficit, winning the final 4–2 on aggregate.

Background
For the fourth time in five seasons of the CONCACAF Champions League, the final was played between two Mexican sides. This guaranteed a Mexican champion for the eighth straight year and 29th time since the confederation began staging the tournament in 1962 (including the tournament's predecessor, the CONCACAF Champions' Cup). The final was also a repeat of previous year's final, won by Monterrey over Santos Laguna 3–2 on aggregate. Monterrey were the two-time defending champions, having also won the final in 2011.

Santos Laguna finished top of Group 1 ahead of Toronto FC and Águila in the group stage, and were seeded second for the championship stage, where they eliminated Houston Dynamo in the quarterfinals and Seattle Sounders FC in the semifinals.

Monterrey finished top of Group 7 ahead of Municipal and Chorrillo in the group stage, and were seeded first for the championship stage, where they eliminated Xelajú in the quarterfinals and Los Angeles Galaxy in the semifinals.

Road to the final

Note: In all results below, the score of the finalist is given first.

Rules
The final was played on a home-and-away two-legged basis. The away goals rule was used if the aggregate score was level after normal time of the second leg, but not after extra time, and so the final was decided by penalty shoot-out if the aggregate score was level after extra time of the second leg.

Matches

First leg

Second leg

References

External links

Finals
Santos Laguna matches
C.F. Monterrey matches
2012–13 in Mexican football
International club association football competitions hosted by Mexico
CONCACAF Champions League finals